Constantin-Liviu Cepoi (born April 25, 1969) is a Romanian-Moldovan luger who competed from the early 1990s to the early 2000s.

He was born in Broşteni, Drăguşeni, Suceava County.

Competing in four Winter Olympics, he earned his best finish of fourth in the men's doubles event at Albertville in 1992 for Romania and 38th in the men's singles event at Salt Lake City in 2002 for Moldova.

Cepoi was appointed Vice President of Sport for Romania on December 11, 2006.

References
1992 luge men's doubles results
1994 luge men's doubles results
1998 luge men's doubles results
2002 luge men's singles results
FIL-Luge profile: Cepoi, Liviu-Constantin
Roportal.ro's announcement of Cepoi's appointment to the Vice President of Sport position in December 2006

External links
 
 
 

1969 births
Living people
Moldovan male lugers
Romanian male lugers
Olympic lugers of Romania
Olympic lugers of Moldova
Lugers at the 1992 Winter Olympics
Lugers at the 1994 Winter Olympics
Lugers at the 1998 Winter Olympics
Lugers at the 2002 Winter Olympics
People from Suceava County